Guns  is a 1990 action film about a group of female agents who are sent to take out a South American gun runner. The film was written and directed by Andy Sidaris, and stars Erik Estrada, Dona Speir, Devin DeVasquez, Cynthia Brimhall, and Danny Trejo. It's the fifth installment in the Triple B series.

Plot
An international crime lord stages a brutal murder to lure federal agents away from Hawaii in an attempt to smuggle assault weapons from China to South America, via Hawaii.

Cast

See also
Girls with guns

References

External links

Guns on NanarLand

1990 films
1990s action films
1990s crime drama films
1990s spy films
American sexploitation films
1990s English-language films
American spy action films
American crime drama films
Girls with guns films
Films directed by Andy Sidaris
1990 drama films
Films set in Hawaii
1990s American films